"How You Feel" is a song by American rapper Trippie Redd. It was released as a single from his debut studio album, Life's a Trip.

Background
"How You Feel" is a guitar-driven track that showcases Trippie Redd's interest in rock music as well as his utilization of clean singing, rather than his usual vocal style of rapping.

The single contains an interpolation of the guitar in Eddie Money's "Baby Hold On"

References

2018 songs
Trippie Redd songs
American alternative rock songs
Emo songs
Songs written by Trippie Redd
Songs written by Eddie Money